Black is Lita Ford's sixth studio album and featured a change of style in her music, compared to her other albums. Black sees Ford move into other musical styles such as blues and grunge, while still maintaining her metal and rock roots. There would be a 14-year gap between Black and her next studio album, 2009's Wicked Wonderland.

Track listing
All songs were written by Michael Dan Ehmig and Lita Ford, except where noted.

 "Black" – 5:07
 "Fall" (Rodger Carter, Larry 'Bones' Dennison, Ford, Debby Holiday) – 5:18
 "Loverman" – 5:55
 "Killin' Kind" (Ehmig, Ford, Taylor Rhodes) – 4:29
 "Hammerhead" – 4:37
 "Boilin' Point" – 3:51
 "Where Will I Find My Heart Tonight" – 4:17
 "War of the Angels" – 4:46
 "Joe" (Carter, Dennison, Ford, Holiday) – 5:40
 "White Lightnin'" – 3:58
 "Smokin' Toads" (Instrumental) (Ford) – 4:13
 "Spider Monkeys" – 6:51

Personnel

Musicians
Lita Ford - lead vocals, all guitars
Larry 'Bones' Dennison - bass
Rodger Carter - drums and percussion
Additional personnel
Steve Reid - additional percussion
Bruce Robb - Hammond B3
Jimmy Z - harmonica
Martin Tillman - cello on "War of the Angels"
Jim Gillette, Michael Dan Ehmig, Dave King, Pork Chop, Jeff Scott Soto, Billy DiCicco - backing vocals

Production
The Robb Brothers - producers, engineers, mixing
Matt Ellard, Doug Trantow, Joe Breuer, Mike Gibson - assistant engineers
Steve Hall - mastering
Guitar and Studio Technician- Toni Francavilla

References

1995 albums
Lita Ford albums
ZYX Music albums